Yengi Kandi (also Romanized as Yengī Kandī; also known as Yangi Kand, Yengī Kand, Yengikend, and Yeyīn Kand) is a village in Lahijan Rural District, Khosrowshahr District, Tabriz County, East Azerbaijan Province, Iran. At the 2006 census, its population was 1,411, in 337 families.

References 

Populated places in Tabriz County